Domino is an Armenian sitcom developed by Harout Khalafyan. The series premiered on Armenia TV on September 15, 2015.
The series takes place in Yerevan, Armenia.

Series overview
Because of problems at work, three friends (Mika, Norik, Garik/Doctor) decide to get together and set up an own business. Saying goodbye to the former management in not very amiable manner they apply for a loan from the bank. Money given by the bank is less than the needed amount, so the young men decide to fill the lack. They bet all the money and unfortunately lose everything. There’s nothing left for them to do but to return to ex job, to stand not so friendly boss, to work double time in order to be able to pay the loan. Realization of all this should be combined with their personal life. In one case a suspicious wife controlling the income of her husband, in other case a fiancée whose family has been waiting long for their marriage, and in third case an emerging new romance.

Cast and characters
 Sos Janibekyan portrays Mika (seasons 1,2,3,4,5) Single boy
 Mher Khachatryan portrays Garik  "Doctor" (Seasons 1,2,3,4,5) Husband of Sofa
 Narek Baveyan portrays Norik (Seasons 1,2,3,4,5) Ex-boyfriend of Lilit
 Anna Grigoryan portrays Ani (season 1) Director of Cafe
 Gayane Avetisyan portrays Sofa (Seasons 1,2,3,) Wife of Garik
 Lika Salmanyan portrays Lilit (Season 1) Engaged of Norik
 Arsen Grigoryan portrays Artur (Seasons 1,2,3) Bank employee
 Rippi Navasardyan portrays Kara (Seasons 1,2,3,4,5) Wife of Viktor
 Yelena Vardanyan portrays Nelly Vardanovna (Seasons 1,) Director of gym, mistress of Gago
 Satenik Ohanyan portrays Margarita "Margo" (Seasons 1,2) Director of Massage Center
 Ara Karagyan portrays Alik (Season 1,2) Director of restaurant
 Narine Aleksanyan portrays Janna (1,2,3,4,5) Worker in restaurant
 Hayk Hambartzumyan portrays Viktor (Seasons 1,2) Husband of Kara
 Jora Hovhannisyan portrays Gugo (Seasons 1,2) Worker in restaurant
 Hovhannes Yuryan - portrays Gago (Seasons 1,) Margarita sister's husband,mistress of Nelly Vardanovna
 Silvi Barkova portrays - Lili (Season 2,3,4,5)
 Saten Ghazaryan portrays - Emma (Season 1,2,3,4,5)
 Liana Nikoghosyan portrays - Erika (Season 2)
 Christina Khachatryan portrays - Iza (Season 2)
 Hovhannes Davtyan portrays - Yura (Season 2)
 Sona Shahgeldyan portrays - Sona (Season 2-3)2,3
 

 Arpine Israelyan portrays - Nare (Season 3,4,5)
 Zara Minasyan portrays -  Anna (Season 3)
 Armina Asryan portrays - Anushik (Season 3)
 Sergey Grigoryan portrays - Arakel Arkhangelski (Season 3,4,5)
 Tina Gavalyan portrays - Tina (Season 4) Sofa's aunt.                                                           
 Hovhannes Azoyan portrays - Miko (Season 5)
 Mery Hakobyan portrays - Sofi ( Season 5)

References

External links
 

Armenian comedy television series
Armenian-language television shows
Armenia TV original programming
2010s teen sitcoms
2010s Armenian television series
2015 Armenian television series debuts